This is a list of defunct airlines of New Zealand.

See also

 List of airlines of New Zealand
 List of airports in New Zealand

References

New Zealand
Airlines
Airlines, defunct